The Cradle Stakes is an American flat Thoroughbred horse race for two-year-olds held at Belterra Park (formerly River Downs) in Cincinnati, Ohio. Open to two-year-olds, it is run over a distance of  miles on the turf.

It was originally created as a dirt race for juveniles in 1977. Miller Genuine Draft sponsored the race from the beginning and, until 2009, it was the longest continuously sponsored Thoroughbred race in the United States. During the 1980s, the Cradle Stakes grew to become the richest race for 2-year-olds in Ohio. One notable winner in that decade was Spend a Buck, who won the 1984 Cradle before going on to win the Kentucky Derby and Horse of the Year honors in 1985.

The Cradle Stakes was moved to the turf in 2007 to serve as a prep for the new Breeders' Cup Juvenile Turf race. River Downs management put the Cradle, and its filly counterpart the Bassinet, on hiatus after 2010 as part of a new contract with horsemen in an effort to maintain daily purses. In July 2022, Belterra management announced that both races would return in September of that year.

Winners 

 ‡ In 2009, the race was run off the turf.

References

Equibase Profile - Cradle Stakes

1977 establishments in Ohio
Horse races in Ohio
Flat horse races for two-year-olds
Turf races in the United States
Previously graded stakes races in the United States
Ungraded stakes races in the United States
Recurring sporting events established in 1977